Calosoma haydeni is a species of ground beetle in the subfamily of Carabinae. It was described by Horn in 1870.

References

haydeni
Beetles described in 1870